Rudy H. Fichtenbaum is an American economist.

References

Living people
Wright State University faculty
Year of birth missing (living people)
20th-century American economists